William Smith (11 May 1877 – 12 March 1953) was a Canadian sports shooter. He competed at the 1908 Summer Olympics winning a bronze medal in the team military rifle event.

References

1877 births
1953 deaths
Canadian male sport shooters
Olympic shooters of Canada
Shooters at the 1908 Summer Olympics
Sportspeople from Ottawa
Olympic bronze medalists for Canada
Olympic medalists in shooting
Medalists at the 1908 Summer Olympics
20th-century Canadian people